Carmen Lucía Aldana Roldán (born March 9, 1992, in Cali) is a Colombian model and holds the title of Miss Colombia 2012. Aldana represented Colombia in Miss Universe 2013. She was the last Colombian delegate of the Miss Universe 1st Colombian drought, as her successor as Miss Colombia, Paulina Vega, won the title as Miss Universe 2014.

Early life
Aldana grew up in Samanes de Guadalupe a low middle-class neighborhood in Cali, Valle del Cauca, Colombia, and is the daughter of Maria Consuelo Roldan de Aldana (A Housewife) and Hector Aldana (A lawyer) she is the youngest of five children.  Aldana graduated from public school Instituto Tecnico Industrial. She was raised Catholic but since 2003 when she was 11 years she and her family became members of a Protestant church called Avivando La Fe in Cali, Colombia. Aldana identifies herself as Protestant.

Education
She attended Universidad Autonoma de Occidente up until she won; she was studying her last year of Journalism.  One of her bigger dreams is to be the Producer and Director of a TV show.

Miss Colombia
Miss Valle, Lucia Aldana was crowned Miss Colombia 2012 by Daniella Alvarez (Miss Colombia 2011) at the 78th edition of Miss Colombia beauty pageant which took place at the Convention Center Julio Cesar Turbay Ayala, in the auditorium Gethsemane, Cartagena de Indias on grand coronation night of Monday, November 12, 2012. She then competed in Miss Universe 2013 in Moscow, Russia but failed to place in the semifinals.

References

External links
Official Miss Colombia website

1992 births
Living people
Miss Colombia winners
Colombian beauty pageant winners
Miss Universe 2013 contestants